The 2nd Jussi Awards ceremony, presented by Elokuvajournalistit ry, honored the best Finnish films released between October 1, 1944 and September 30, 1945 and took place on November 16, 1945 at Restaurant Adlon in Helsinki. The Jussi Awards were presented in seven different categories, including Best Director, Best Cinematography, Best Production Design, Best Actor, Best Actress, Best Supporting Actor, and Best Supporting Actress.

Awards

References

External links
  

Jussi Awards